The National Association for Public Health Statistics and Information Systems (NAPHSIS) is a nonprofit national association whose members represent state and local vital records, health statistics and information system agencies. NAPHSIS is incorporated as a nonprofit corporation in the District of Columbia, with offices in Silver Spring, Maryland.

History
First organized in 1933, NAPHSIS was originally known as the American Association of State Registration Executives. The organization has undergone many name changes since its inception, including
      
 American Association of State and Provincial Registration Executives, 1938
 American Association of Registration Executives (AARE), 1939
 American Association for Vital Records and Public Health Statistics (AAVR-PHS), 1958
 Association for Vital Records and Health Statistics (AVRHS), 1980
 Association for Public Health Statistics and Information Systems (APHSIS), 1995
 National Association for Public Health Statistics and Information Systems (NAPHSIS), 1996

References

External links
 

Non-profit organizations based in Maryland